This is a list of musical works which consist mostly or entirely of silence.

Theory
Some composers have discussed the significance of silence or a silent composition without ever composing such a work. In his 1907 manifesto, Sketch of a New Esthetic of Music, Ferruccio Busoni described its significance:

After Paul Hindemith read this, he suggested a work consisting of nothing but pauses and fermatas in 1916.

Classical compositions
A number of classical compositions consisting primarily of silence have been composed since 1896:
Il Silenzio: pezzo caratteristico e descrittivo (stile moderno) (1896) by "Samuel", a pseudonym, probably ; published in the Year 1. Vol. 1. Nº11. Supplement of the journal La Nuova Musica.

Funeral March for the Obsequies of a Deaf Man (1897) by Alphonse Allais, a French writer and humorist (1854–1905); published in his Album primo-avrilesque

In futurum (1919) by Erwin Schulhoff (1894–1942)

Silent music (1941), by Raymond Scott (1909–1994)

Monotone-Silence Symphony (1949), by Yves Klein

4′33″ (1952) by John Cage (1912–1992)

4'33" No. 2 (1962) by John Cage

Fur Music (1971), by Nelson Howe

Songs

"Mute - By Maison Margiela" by Tommy Cash (2021)
"12:97:24:99" by Mudvayne (2002)
"15 Minutes" by Télépopmusik (2005)
"18 sekúndur fyrir sólarupprás" (18 seconds before sunrise) by Sigur Rós (1997)
"23 Seconds of Silence" by Wilco (1999)
"42 Minutes of Silence" by Milosh on Quiet Time, with Milosh (2002)
"9-11-01" by Soulfly (2002)
"A big thank you to" and "Turn" by C418 on Bushes and Marshmallows (2009)
"Absolute Elsewhere" by Coil
"Ad Interim" by E.S.T on Leucocyte (2008)
"A Moment of Silence" by The Neighbourhood (2015)
"Anniversary Of World War III" by The West Coast Pop Art Experimental Band on Volume 3: A Child's Guide to Good and Evil (1968)
"Are We Here? (Criminal Justice Bill? Mix)" by Orbital
"The Ballad of Richard Nixon" by John Denver (1969)
"The Best of Marcel Marceau" by Michael Viner
"Beware! The Funk is Everywhere" by Afrika Bambaataa (1986)
"Birthdeath Experience" by Whitehouse (1980)
"Seinsart" by The New Blockaders (1985)
"Null Bei Ohr" by The New Blockaders (2003)
"(Blank)" by The All-American Rejects
"blank track" by The Jesus Lizard on deluxe remastered reissues of Liar (1992) and Down (1994) and "[silence]" on Goat (1991)
"Brawthers" by Brawthers, 2019 (Just the guitar is silent)
"BunaB #5" by Al Crowder
"Extract From The Compassion & Humanity Of Margaret Thatcher", on the Cherry Red Records compilation Pillows and Prayers 2 (1984)
"Le chant des carpes" by Ludwig von 88 on Houlala II "la mission" (1987)
 "Gestenstücke" by Juan María Solare, a collection of five pieces for 4 performers in which a musical structure is used to put order in non-sounding elements, concretely gestures. For instance, the first piece of the cycle is a canon of gestures. (2008)
"I Predict Some Quiet" by the Kaiser Chiefs (2005)
"In Remembrance" by Pan.Thy.Monium on Khaooohs and Kon-Fus-Ion (1996)
"[intermission]" by Titus Andronicus (band) on The Most Lamentable Tragedy (2015)
"Intentionally Left Blank" by James Holden (in The Idiots Are Winning (2006))
"A Lot of Nothing" by Coheed and Cambria (Split into 11 sections ranging from 5–15 seconds in length)
"Magic Window" by Boards of Canada
"The Misinterpretation of Silence and its Disastrous Consequences" by Type O Negative on Slow, Deep and Hard (1991)
"The Most Important Track On the Album" by Astronautalis (2008)
"(nothing)" by The Microphones
 "Tense Atmosphere", a graphic score by Juan María Solare which consists of a silence with a sforzato sign (2013)
"The Nutopian International Anthem" by John Lennon (1973)
"Two Minutes Silence" by John Lennon and Yoko Ono
"Omitted for Clarity" by Karnivool on Themata (2005)
"One Minute of Silence" by Soundgarden
"A One Minute Silence" by Mike Batt
"Page 13" by Fantômas
"Path XII Inlustra Nigror" by Vesania
"Pause" by Rob Dougan
"Piste Silencieuse" by Wax Tailor
"Pregnant Pause... Intermission" by Leila Bela
"Pure Digital Silence" by the Melvins
"Room 0: Solo for Conductor" by Nits
"Rwanda" by Radio Boy (2001).
"Schweigeminute" by VNV Nation on Praise the Fallen (1999)
 "Silence" by Karl Bartos (2013)
"(Silence)" by Ciccone Youth
"[Silence]" by Korn
"[Silence]" ("A suitable place for those with tired ears to pause and resume listening later") by Robert Wyatt
"Silence" by Brian Eno on Drums Between the Bells (2011)
"Silence" by Knife Party
"Silencio sepulcral" (Sepulchral Silence) by Soziedad Alkoholika
"Song of the Deaf Girl" by Cloud Cult on The Meaning of 8 (2007)
"Štrajk" by Hladno pivo on Šamar (2003)
"The Sound of Free speech" by Crass
"Tathagatagarbha" by Clarence Clarity on No Now (2015)
"There's a Riot Goin' On" by Sly Stone
"Thirty-second Silence" by Guster
"Three Bagatelles, for David Tudor" by György Ligeti
"The Ten Coolest Things About New Jersey" by The Bloodhound Gang
"Track 3," accidentally released as a promotional single on Taylor Swift's album 1989. It consisted of eight seconds of white noise and topped the iTunes chart in Canada.
"Tunnel of Goats XVII" by Coil
"You Can Make Your Own Music" by Covenant (a 4-minute and 33 second silent track, in reference to John Cage's composition 4′33")
"Leave On" by Blackmail
"Minut ćutanja" (Moment of silence) by Marčelo
"Non Musical Silence" by The All-American Rejects
"Silence" by Alva Noto on Unitxt
"Weg" by Die Fantastischen Vier on Die 4. Dimension
"MICROPHONE MAN" by Kinzsters172
"Untitled" by Brainbombs on  Brainbombs
"Dramatic Pause Of Silence To Signify The End Of The Album And Beginning Of Additional Songs Included On The CD To Make People Feel Better About Buying The CD Instead Of The Vinyl Version" by Kid606 on Who Still Kill Sound?
"Long March Rocket Or Doomed Airliner" by A Silver Mt. Zion on He Has Left Us Alone but Shafts of Light Sometimes Grace the Corner of Our Rooms...

AlbumsSilent Tracks of Various Useful Lengths, a 2010 album by Brett Black consisting of 8 tracks of silence, was the first completely silent album to be commercially available through the iTunes Store.The Wit and Wisdom of Ronald Reagan, satirical LP issued by Stiff Records in 1980. (Side one is "The Wit" and side two "The Wisdom", both are divided into multiple tracks but are silent.)Rosemary Brown Psyches Again!, a 1982 Enharmonic Records LP by David DeBoor Canfield. (Side one contains parodies of works supposedly taken down by British psychic Rosemary Brown from deceased composers. Side two is silent and contains an Introduction by Marcel Marceau and a "discussion" by Johann Sebastian Bach and Johannes Brahms on the musical merits of Rosemary's Brown's efforts.)Sleepify, a 2014 album by Vulfpeck consisting of 10 tracks of silence. The album was released on the music streaming service Spotify and generated $20,000 in royalty over a two-month period. It exposed a loophole in the streaming service's royalty calculation model.Epater Les Bourgeois and Simphonie In O Minor by The New Blockaders in 1985 / 1991.tranquility'' by LOIKE in 2021.

See also
 Anti-art

References

Silent
Musical comp
Silent